Tsukuhara syndrome, also known as Radioulnar synostosis-microcephaly-scoliosis syndrome is an infrequently occurring genetic skeletal dysplasia which is characterized by a combination of radioulnar synostosis, microcephaly, scoliosis, short height, and intellectual disabilities. Only 13 cases worldwide have been described in medical literature.

References

Congenital disorders of musculoskeletal system
Syndromes